Walter Berry may refer to:

Walter Berry (bass-baritone) (1929–2000), Austrian opera singer
Walter Berry (basketball) (born 1964), American former professional basketball player
Walter Berry (politician), Canadian speaker of the legislative assembly of Prince Edward Island from 1780–1784
Walter Van Rensselaer Berry (1859–1927), American lawyer, diplomat, friend of writers

See also
Lyall Berry (1893–1970), Australian cricketer, born Walter Lyall Berry